Pseudorhaphitoma darnleyi is a small sea snail, a marine gastropod mollusk in the family Mangeliidae.

Description
The length of the shell attains 12 mm.

(Original description) The slender pyramidal shell is acuminated. It is six-sided, horny brown, longitudinally ribbed, crossed with raised striae, somewhat rugose and with smooth interstices. The shell contains 7-8 flattened whorls. The suture is opaque. The sculpture is much plainer on the body whorl. The inner lip shows a thin deposit of callus. The outer lip is thin, edged with black. The sinus is wide, cut deep down. The siphonal canal is short. 

The slender, six-sided shell has a pyramidal shape. It is longitudinally ribbed and crossed with raised striae, somewhat rugose, interstices smooth. It contains 7 to 8 flattened whorls. The outer lip  is slightly varicose. The sinus is wide and deep. The color is yellowish brown, the lip sometimes black-edged.

This species is remarkable by the absence of fine grained spirals and is by this an  aberrant members of this genus.

Distribution
This marine genus is endemic to Australia and occurs in the Gulf of Carpentaria and off Queensland, Australia

References

External links

darnleyi
Gastropods described in 1876
Gastropods of Australia